Fengqiao Road is the name of a station on Line 11 on the Shanghai Metro. It opened on December 31, 2009.

References

Railway stations in Shanghai
Shanghai Metro stations in Putuo District
Line 11, Shanghai Metro
Railway stations in China opened in 2009